Wuhe is a town under the administration of Yuexi County, Anhui, China. , it has 12 villages under its administration:
Wuhe Village
Shaling Village
Yehe Village
Hengpai Village
Baibu Village
Sihe Village
Xiangshan Village
Taoli Village
Miaodaoshan Village
Maoshan Village
Henan Village
Shuanghe Village

References 

Towns in Anhui
Yuexi County, Anhui